Jerry Martin may refer to:

 Jerry Martin (baseball) (born 1949), former Major League Baseball outfielder
 Jerry Martin (ski jumper) (born 1950), American former ski jumper
 Jerry Martin (composer), American composer
 Jerry Martin, a tenor vocalist for the Kingdom Heirs
 Jerry L. Martin, chairman emeritus of the American Council of Trustees and Alumni
 Jerry E. Martin, United States Attorney in Tennessee